The enzyme protein serine/threonine phosphatase (EC 3.1.3.16; systematic name protein-serine/threonine-phosphate phosphohydrolase) is a form of phosphoprotein phosphatase that acts upon phosphorylated serine/threonine residues:

[a protein]-serine/threonine phosphate + H2O = [a protein]-serine/threonine + phosphate

Serine and threonine phosphates are stable under physiological conditions, so a phosphatase enzyme has to remove the phosphate to reverse the regulation signal.  Ser/Thr-specific protein phosphatases are regulated partly by their location within the cell and by specific inhibitor proteins.

Serine and threonine are amino acids which have similar side-chain compositions that contain a hydroxyl group and thus can be phosphorylated by enzymes called serine/threonine protein kinases. The addition of the phosphate group can be reversed by enzymes called serine/threonine phosphatases. The addition and removal of phosphate groups regulates many cellular pathways involved in cell proliferation, programmed cell death (apoptosis), embryonic development, and cell differentiation.

Examples
There are several known groups with numerous members in each:
 PPP1 (α, β, γ1, γ2)
 PPP2 (formerly 2A)
 PPP3 (formerly 2b, also known as calcineurin)
 PPP2C
 PPP4
 PPP5
 PPP6
(links are to the catalytic subunit)

References

External links
 

EC 3.1.3